The Battle of Lake Poyang was a naval conflict which took place (30 August – 4 October 1363) between the rebel forces of Zhu Yuanzhang and Chen Youliang during the Red Turban Rebellion which led to the fall of the Yuan dynasty. Chen Youliang besieged Nanchang with a large fleet on Lake Poyang, one of China's largest freshwater lakes, and Zhu Yuanzhang met his force with a smaller fleet. After an inconclusive engagement exchanging fire, Zhu employed fire ships to burn the enemy tower ships, and destroyed their fleet. This was the last major battle of the rebellion prior to the rise of the Ming dynasty.

Background 
On 30 August 1363, the forces of Chen Han conducted a major amphibious assault on Nanchang but failed to take it due to the defenders' use of cannons and suffered great losses. The town of Nanchang was strategically located to guard Lake Poyang, which connected the Yangzi with other river basins. During the early 1360s Zhu Yuanzhang held key garrisons on the lake and administered them from Nanjing 560 kilometers downriver. In 1362, Chen Youliang tried to deposit his troops on the city walls with "tower ships". This proved futile as the city defenders simply moved the walls back and Chen was forced to personally lead an assault on the city gates. They were repelled with a barrage of cannonfire and driven back. After this failure, Chen set up a blockade, determined to starve out the defenders, but a small fishing boat managed to slip out and reached Nanjing in time to warn Zhu Yuanzhang.

The battle 

Zhu Yuanzhang's fleet arrived at Hukou on 24 August and relieved Nanchang on the 28th. Chen Youliang embarked his forces and sailed north into Lake Poyang. The two fleets met on 29 August. Zhu's forces numbered only a third the size of Chen's army. According to one Ming source, Zhu's forces arrived armed with "fire bombs, fire guns, fire arrows, fire seeds [probably grenades], large and small fire lances, large and small 'commander' fire-tubes, large and small iron bombs, rockets." This shows that older gunpowder weapons co-existed alongside guns, and proto-guns such as fire lances were not supplanted until after early Ming. A new weapon called the "No Alternative" was also mentioned. The No Alternative was "made from a circular reed mat about five inches around and seven feet long that was pasted over with red paper and bound together with silk and hemp— stuffed inside it was gunpowder twisted in with bullets and all kinds of [subsidiary] gunpowder weapons." It was hung from a pole on the foremast, and when an enemy ship came into close range, the fuse was lit, and the weapon would supposedly fall onto the enemy ship, at which point things inside shot out "and burned everything to bits, with no hope of salvation." 

On 30 August, Zhu deployed his fleet in 11 squadrons with orders to "get close to the enemy's ships and first set off gunpowder weapons (發火器), then bows and crossbows, and finally attack their ships with short range weapons." Fire bombs were hurled using naval trebuchets and Zhu's forces succeeded in "burning twenty or more enemy vessels and killing or drowning many enemy troops," but their own flagship also caught fire and hit a sandbar. Chen's warships drove back the opposing line until they fell back to a shallow area where they could not be pursued. Zhu tried again to engage with Chen's fleet in ship to ship combat and was driven back once more with severe losses. The next day, the wind shifted towards Chen's forces and Zhu sent fire ships into them, destroying several hundred vessels. While guns were used during the battle, ultimately they were not pivotal to success, and the battle was won using incendiary weapons.

On 2 September, the two fleets engaged in battle again. Though still outnumbered, Zhu's forces were able to isolate and destroy larger enemy warships, forcing them to withdraw. Afterwards, Zhu's fleet settled into a blockade for another month before Chen decided to make a break for it on 4 October. Zhu was ready with fire ships set adrift, scattering Chen's ships so that clusters of ships engaged in combat far from each other. Chen Youliang was killed when an arrow struck his head.

Aftermath 
Chen Youliang was succeeded by his son, Chen Li, who surrendered to Zhu in 1364.

The Western Wu's victory here cemented their position as the leading rebel group. Five years later, the Western Wu would overthrow the Yuan and take command over China. Zhu Yuanzhang then became the first emperor of the Ming dynasty as the Hongwu Emperor.

See also 
 Red Turban Rebellions
 Ming campaign against the Uriankhai
 Battle of Buir Lake

Notes

References

Further reading 
 .
 Hok-lam Chan, 'The Rise of Ming T'ai-tsu (1368–98): Facts and Fictions in Early Ming Official Historiography', Journal of the American Oriental Society, Vol. 95, No. 4 (Oct. – Dec., 1975), p. 703, quoting TTSL, 13/165, abbreviation for (Ming) T'ai-tsu shih-lu (1418), ed. Yao Kuang-hsiao (1335–1418) et al., 257 chüan. Academia Sinica, Taipei 1962. (1.1.1.).【陳，Ming T'aitsu refers to 明太祖】
 Dreyer, Edward L., 'The Poyang Campaign of 1363: Inland Naval Warfare in the Founding of the Ming Dynasty,' in Kierman, Frank A., and Fairbank, John K. (eds.), Chinese Ways in Warfare (Cambridge, MA., Harvard University Press, 1974). 
 Turnbull, Stephen, 'Fighting Ships of the Far East (1): China and Southeast Asia 202 BC – AD 1419.' (Oxford: Osprey Publishing, 2002). 
 
 Wakeman, Frederic, Jr., 'Voyages', American Historical Review, Vol. 98, No. 1 (Feb., 1993), pp. 1–17.

Wars involving Imperial China
Lake Poyang
Lake Poyang
Lake Poyang
Lake Poyang
1363 in Asia
14th century in China
Military history of Jiangxi
1363 in the Mongol Empire
Transition from Yuan to Ming